The Saitō Cabinet is the 30th Cabinet of Japan led by Saitō Makoto from May 26, 1932, to July 8, 1934.

Cabinet

References 

Cabinet of Japan
1932 establishments in Japan
Cabinets established in 1932
Cabinets disestablished in 1934